Mahal is a census town in the Pandabeswar CD block in the Durgapur subdivision of the Paschim Bardhaman district in the Indian state of West Bengal.

Geography

Location

Mahal, Baidyanathpur, Dalurband, Ramnagar, Bilpahari and Kendra Khottamdi form a cluster of census towns in the northern portion of Pandabeswar CD block.

Urbanisation
According to the 2011 census, 79.22% of the population of the Durgapur subdivision was urban and 20.78% was rural. The Durgapur subdivision has 1 municipal corporation at Durgapur and 38 (+1 partly) census towns  (partly presented in the map alongside; all places marked on the map are linked in the full-screen map).

Demographics
According to the 2011 Census of India, Mahal had a total population of 4,841 of which 2,510 (52%) were males and 2,331 (48%) were females. Population in the age range 0–6 years was 647. The total number of literate persons in Mahal was 3,078 (73.39% of the population over 6 years).

*For language details see Pandabeswar (community development block)#Language and religion

Infrastructure

According to the District Census Handbook 2011, Bardhaman, Mahal covered an area of 3.3532 km2. Among the civic amenities, the protected water-supply involved service reservoir, tap water from treated sources, uncovered wells. It had 418 domestic electric connections. Among the medical facilities there is a dispensary/ health centre 1 km away. Among the educational facilities it had were 2 primary schools, 1 middle school, the nearest secondary school,  senior secondary school at Pandabeswar 2 km away.

Economy
As per the ECL website telephone numbers, operational collieries in the Pandaveswar Area of Eastern Coalfields in 2018 are: Dalurband Colliery, Khottadih OCP, Khottadih UG, Madhaipur Colliery, Manderbony Colliery, Pandaveswar Colliery and South Samla Colliery.

References

Cities and towns in Paschim Bardhaman district